Secondment is the assignment of a member of one organisation to another organisation for a temporary period.

Job rotation
The employee typically retains their salary and other employment rights from their primary organization but they work closely within the other organization to provide training, a liaison between the two companies and the sharing of experience. Secondment is a more formal type of job rotation. This is not to be confused with temporary work.

Secondment, sometimes referred to as employer of record (EoR) or professional employer organization (PEO), can also be used to help organizations hire during a headcount freeze. In the current day, some businesses use it as a solution to enter into new markets, bypassing the cost of opening their own business entity.

Use

For example, statisticians from the Government Statistical Service may be assigned to the Full Fact charity, to check statistics presented in political campaigns and the mass media. In the military, an exchange officer is a commissioned officer in a country's armed forces who is temporarily seconded either to a unit of the armed forces of another country or to another branch of the armed forces of their own country.

See also

Student exchange program
Temporary duty assignment

References

Further reading
 
 

Human resource management